Kopi Kade (Coffee Shop) (Sinhala:කෝපි කඩේ) is a popular Sri Lankan comedy-drama television series broadcast on the Independent Television Network. One of Sri Lanka's iconic television series in history, Kopi Kade remains the most popular program at its time-slot according to Survey Research Lanka. The 1500th uninterrupted weekly episode was broadcast on January 17, 2017. It was telecasted on Sundays for a brief period, where the drama was starts back to telecast on every Wednesday which was later telecast on every Friday at 9.00 p.m.

Plot
ITN director Thevis Guruge developed the program as a platform to discuss social issues and convey them to the general public.  The series would revolve around a village "kopi kade," because small shops that serve coffee, food and groceries generally serve as the center of town life.  Women frequent such establishments to obtain the groceries they need, and men join to play games like draughts while discussing matters of interest.

Cast and characters

Current
 Rathna Sumanapala as Kopi Kade Hamine
 Rodney Fraser as Gajan
 K.D. Siripala as Dingi Mahaththaya
 Geetha Bulathsinghala as Geetha Naga

 Upasena Subasinghe as Pala
 Jayarathna Rupasinghe as Sirisena
 Saman Gunawardena as Banda
 Sena Gunawardana as Kiri Hoda
 Upali Silva as Sugathan
 Wasantha Kumarasiri as Sunimal
 Kapila Sigera as Shelton Mahattaya
 Ariyasena Handuwela as Village Officer
 Niluka Rekhani as Kamala
 Udeni Chandrasiri as Kapu Mahaththaya

Kumudini Sewwandi as Yasa Naga
 Boniface Jayasantha as Poottuwa
 Eddie Amarasinghe as Piyum Mahathaya 
 Awantha Somasiri as Jason
 Udaya Kumari Ranasingha as Poli Siriya

Retired
 Kumara Siriwardena as Nimal
 Susila Kottage as Dayawathi
 Nanda Wilegoda as Alis
 Damayantha Perera as Suwanda
 Rahal Bulathsinghala as Podi Mahaththaya
 Ganga Nadee Withana as Tikiri Naga
 Saranapala Jayasuriya as Kade Mudalali
 Kumari Perera as Kade Hamine's daughter
 Dilip Rohana ("Sudhaa" of "La Hiru Dahasak" teledrama) as Kade Hamine's son
 Victor Fernando as Loku Hamuduruvo  Chief Monk at the Village Temple
 Pathma Perera as Kopi Kade Polee Siriya
 Jerad Moraes as Kopi Kade Suda
 K A Piyakaru as Gurun gurun
Thilak kumara rathnayaka (somadasa)
Princy  fernando ( violet)

Deceased
 Denawaka Hamine as Loku Hamine
 Martin Gunadasa as Poli Mudalali 
 Chandrasiri Kodithuwakku as Abilin Maama 
 Susila Kuragama as Ensina
 Damitha Saluwadana as Asilin 
 Premadasa Vithanage as Minee Petti Mudalali (Town's Undertaker) 
 Lal Senadheera as Annasiwatte Rathnapala (Rathne Lamaya) 
 Ranjith Amarasekara as Iskole Mahaththaya 
 Raja Sumanapala as Ali Jamis
 Devi Sakunthala as Suwanda's Mother - Angu Hami
 Wimal Wickramarachchi as Samel Appu
 Thusith Pathiraja as Monk at temple
 Kusum Kondegama as Sirisena's mother
 Sunil Hettiarachchi as Giran
 Elson Divithurugama as Lee Mudalali
 Nanasiri Kaluarachchi as Kaluwa
 Chitra Wakishta as Somi Nona
 Wimaladharma Vitharana as Weda mahaththaya
 Srilal Abeykoon as Appuwa

Production
Andrew Jayamanna was the first director of the program. By 2006, the show had seen six directors, including the Saman Fernando. Sudam Dayarathne  and Janaka Mahalpath joined the directing crew after the death of Andrew Jayamanna. Sumith Dias directed the program from 1992 to 1996. Chandika Wijesena and Prabath Dushyantha are now the directors.

References

Sri Lankan drama television series
Sri Lankan television shows
1980s Sri Lankan television series
1990s Sri Lankan television series
2000s Sri Lankan television series
2010s Sri Lankan television series
2020s Sri Lankan television series
1987 Sri Lankan television series debuts
Independent Television Network original programming